The 2009 FEI World Cup Jumping Final was the 31st final of the FEI World Cup Jumping show jumping series. It was held at the Thomas & Mack Center in Las Vegas, Nevada, United States from April 15 to April 19, 2009 for the fifth time following 2000, 2003, 2005, and 2007. Meredith Michaels-Beerbaum of Germany was the defending champion, having won the 2008 final in Gothenburg, Sweden.

External links
Official website

FEI World Cup Jumping Finals
Sports competitions in Las Vegas
2009 in show jumping
2009 in American sports
2009 in sports in Nevada
Equestrian sports competitions in the United States
International sports competitions hosted by the United States